Eight ships of the French Navy have borne the name Flore (Flora):

  (1707–1724), a 10-gun frigate
  (1729–1754)
  (1769–1785)
  (1806–1811), a 44-gun frigate that took part in the Battle of Lissa
  (1803–1840), a 40-gun frigate renamed to Flore in 1814
  (1869–1886), a sail frigate converted to steam before launch
  (1937–1950), a destroyer

The  was renamed HMS Flora after her capture by the Royal Navy, and was named Flore américaine after she was re-acquired from the United States.

French Navy ship names